Give Me the Reason is the second album by the Jamaican musician Lady Saw, released in 1996. The album was noted for its sexually explicit lyrics. The title track incorporates elements of country music.

Critical reception
Vibe, in 2004, deemed the title track a "classic" and a "sweet" slow jam. Spin, in 2007, listed the album as a "Dancehall Essential", writing that Lady Saw is "a cross between a porn star and a feminist scholar."

Track listing 
 Good Wuk
 What is Slackness
 Give Me The Reason
 Darnest Things
 Husband of Mine
 Glory be to God
 Saturday Night at the Movies
 Name Nuh Stand Fi Sex
 Condom
 Lonely Without You
 Life Without Dick
 Love & Understanding
 Ain't No Meaning
 Over & Over

References

1996 albums
Lady Saw albums